The Agoyán is outside of Banos.  It is a beautiful expansive waterfall that is part of the hydroelectric sources of Ecuador.

In 1987, the Ecuadorian government inaugurated the Agoyán hydroelectric plant, which has been part of the country's power grid since then, with a total power output of 156 MW. The plant was built upstream of the waterfall, so as to preserve it.

References

Waterfalls of Ecuador
Geography of Tungurahua Province